Midland Council may be:
Midland Council (Texas)
Midland Council (Michigan)